Patrizia Spuri (born 18 February 1973 in Fara in Sabina) is an Italian former sprinter (400 m) and middle distance runner (800 m).

In her career she won 9 times the national championships. She's the wife of the triple jumper Fabrizio Donato.

National records
 4x400 metres relay: 3'26"69 ( Paris, 20 June 1999) - with Virna De Angeli, Francesca Carbone, Danielle Perpoli
 4x400 metres relay indoor: 3'35"01 ( Ghent, 27 February 2000) - with Virna De Angeli, Francesca Carbone, Carla Barbarino

Achievements

National titles
4 wins in 400 metres at the Italian Athletics Championships (1994, 1996, 1997, 1998)
1 win in 800 metres at the Italian Athletics Championships (1999) 
2 wins in 400 metres at the Italian Athletics Indoor Championships (1994, 1998)
1 win in 800 metres at the Italian Athletics Indoor Championships (2000)

See also
Italian all-time top lists - 400 metres
Italian all-time top lists - 800 metres

References

External links
 

1973 births
Living people
People from Rieti
Italian female sprinters
Italian female middle-distance runners
Olympic athletes of Italy
Athletes (track and field) at the 1996 Summer Olympics
Mediterranean Games gold medalists for Italy
Mediterranean Games bronze medalists for Italy
Athletes (track and field) at the 1997 Mediterranean Games
World Athletics Championships athletes for Italy
Mediterranean Games medalists in athletics
Olympic female sprinters
Sportspeople from the Province of Rieti